(25 July 1895, Hundsheim, Austria – 5 October 1950, London) was a Czech functionalistic architect, student of Jan Kotěra and member of Devětsil. 

He collaborated with Czech structural engineer, Dr. Jaroslav Josef Polivka on the internationally acclaimed Czech Pavilion at the Paris Exposition of 1937.

Krejcar was husband of journalist Milena Jesenská and father of Jana Krejcarová. After the Communist-organized 1948 Czechoslovak coup d'état he went to exile to the United Kingdom.

1895 births
1950 deaths
People from Bruck an der Leitha District
Czech architects
Czechoslovak emigrants to the United Kingdom
Czechoslovak exiles